Saint-Pacôme is a municipality in the Canadian province of Quebec, located in the Kamouraska Regional County Municipality. Saint-Pacome Catholic Church is located in the town.

Local government

Saint-Pacôme forms part of the federal electoral district of Montmagny—L'Islet—Kamouraska—Rivière-du-Loup and has been represented by Bernard Généreux of the Conservative Party since 2015. Provincially, Saint-Pacôme is part of the Côte-du-Sud electoral district and is represented by Mathieu Rivest of the Coalition Avenir Québec since 2022.

Municipal council
 Mayor: Nathalie Lévesque
 Councillors: Christian Dionne, Julie Mercier, Johanne Dubé, Benoît Fraser, Éric Lavoie, Robert Bérubé

See also
 List of municipalities in Quebec

References

External links
 
  Municipalité de Saint-Pacôme

Designated places in Quebec
Municipalities in Quebec
Incorporated places in Bas-Saint-Laurent